Francisco Sá is a municipality in the north of the Brazilian state of Minas Gerais.   the population was 26,369 in a total area of 2,749 km².  The elevation is 664 meters above sea level.

Francisco Sá is located 51 km northeast of regional center Montes Claros and is on highway BR-251.  It is part of the IBGE statistical microregion of Montes Claros.

The main economic activity is cattle raising with 150,720 head counted in 2006.  There were 1,497 rural producers with an agricultural area of 168,645 hectares, of which 100,900 hectares were in natural pasture.  Other crops grown were corn, beans, manioc, bananas, and tropical fruits.  The Gross Domestic Product was R$97,906,000 (2005).  There were 2 banking agencies (2006).  Health needs were taken care of by 13 health clinics.   there was no hospital.  The nearest hospital was in Montes Claros.

Municipal Human Development Index
MHDI: .662
State ranking: 701 out of 853 municipalities
National ranking: 3,570 out of 5,138 municipalities
Life expectancy: 69
Literacy rate: 72 For the complete list see Frigoletto

See also
List of municipalities in Minas Gerais

References

External links
City government site
IBGE

Municipalities in Minas Gerais